Hope Henry Collins (20 August 1904 – 1 April 1980) was an Australian rules footballer who played with Richmond in the Victorian Football League (VFL).

His sole VFL match was in Round 1, 1930. He was injured during the third quarter, and substituted off for Ralph Empey at three quarter time, in what was the first 19th man substitution in VFL history following the introduction of the rule that year.

Notes

External links 

Hope Collins's playing statistics from The VFA Project

1904 births
1980 deaths
Australian rules footballers from Victoria (Australia)
Richmond Football Club players
Nathalia Football Club players
Camberwell Football Club players